Anolis cristifer, the crested lichen anole or Cristifer anole, is a species of lizard in the family Dactyloidae.

References

Anoles
Reptiles described in 1968
Taxa named by Hobart Muir Smith
Reptiles of Mexico
Reptiles of Guatemala